The Women's team épée competition at the 2019 World Fencing Championships was held on 20 and 21 July 2019.

Draw

Finals

Top half

Section 1
Round of 64

Section 2

Bottom half

Section 3
Round of 64

Section 4
Round of 64

Placement rounds

5–8th place bracket

9–16th place bracket

13–16th place bracket

Final ranking

References

External links
Bracket

Women's team épée
2019 in women's fencing